Xi, King of Yan (燕王喜) (?–?) (ruled 255–222 BC) was the last sovereign of the state of Yan in the last days Warring States period of Chinese history.  He was the son of King Xiao of Yan (燕孝王).  He was born as Ji Xi (姬喜), the same name of King Lie of Zhou (周烈王) and Count Yi of Cao (曹夷伯).

In the 28th year of his reign (227 BC), the State of Qin began its conquest of Yan, and its army approached Yishui (易水), modern-day Yi County, Hebei. Seeing the threatening situation in which the State of Yan was in, Crown Prince Dan, King Xi's son, sent assassins Jing Ke, Qin Wuyang and others to kill the Qin king Ying Zheng, under the guise of presenting him with a map of Dukang (督亢) and the severed head of the Qin general Huan Yi.  As Jingke unrolled the map in front of the king, the dagger was revealed, and the assassination failed. This failure only helped to fuel the rage and determination of the Qin king.  He increased the number of troops sent to conquer the state of Yan and ordered Wang Jian to destroy Yan. The bulk of the Yan army was at the frozen Yishui River.  The Yan army was defeated in 226 BC and the Yan ruler, King Xi, fled to the Liaodong Commandery.  To appease the King of Qin, King Xi had his own son executed by decapitation, and his head presented to the king. 

In 222 BC Liaodong fell as well, and Yan was totally conquered by Qin under the general Wang Ben (王賁), the son of Wang Jian. King Xi of Yan was captured alive, and his fate is not known.  Yan was the third last state to fall, and with its destruction the fate of the remaining two Chinese kingdoms was sealed.

Monarchs of Yan (state)
222 BC deaths
Chinese kings
Yan (state)
Zhou dynasty nobility
Year of birth unknown
3rd-century BC Chinese monarchs